The Lillian Wald Houses are a NYCHA housing project on the Lower East Side of Manhattan that honors the housing advocate of the same name. The cornerstone was laid on East Sixth Street and Avenue D in 1947 following a change in state financing laws for which Lillian Wald campaigned.

Construction of the Houses led to the end of Manhattan Street, previously a shortcut between East Third and East Houston Streets.

References

Public housing in Manhattan
Lower East Side